John E. Lewis (1912 – unknown) was a Welsh footballer who played in the English Football League for Stoke City.

Career
Lewis was born in Porthcawl and played for Trethomas and Merthyr Town before joining Stoke City in 1934. He was used mainly in the reserves during his time at the Victoria Ground and only made two first appearances in 1934–35 both coming away from home firstly against Blackburn Rovers in September and then Aston Villa in March.

Career statistics
Source:

References

Welsh footballers
Stoke City F.C. players
English Football League players
1912 births
People from Porthcawl
Sportspeople from Bridgend County Borough
Year of death missing
Association football wing halves
Date of birth missing
Merthyr Town F.C. players